Pelonomus is a genus of long-toed water beetles in the family Dryopidae. There are about five described species in Pelonomus.

Species
These five species belong to the genus Pelonomus:
 Pelonomus griseus Blatchley & Leng, 1916
 Pelonomus impressiventris Blatchl. & Leng, 1916
 Pelonomus obscurus Leconte, 1852
 Pelonomus palpalis Sharp, 1882
 Pelonomus picipes (Olivier, 1791)

References

Further reading

 
 

Dryopidae
Articles created by Qbugbot